RadioWest was a group of 11 AM stations across the Southern half of Western Australia playing 'Real Music Variety', and targeting the 35+ audience. On 15 December 2016, the network renamed itself to Triple M as part of a nationwide move by parent company SCA to bring all its radio brands into line. It is currently owned by Southern Cross Austereo. Formed in the early 1990s, It was once previously owned by DMG Radio. Most programming is local to each market with some network input from the RadioWest Network studios in Bunbury, Gold Coast or Albury.

6TZ Bunbury, 6NA Narrogin and 6CI Collie (Now 6TZ/T 1134) formed the radio division of the Golden West Network until 1988.

Stations

6TZ 963 kHz, 2 kW Bunbury    commenced 1939
6CI 1134 kHz, 2 kW Collie     commenced 1947
6TZ 756 kHz, 2 kW Busselton  commenced 1995
6BY  900 kHz, 2 kW Bridgetown commenced 1953
6VA  783 kHz, 2 kW Albany     commenced 1956
6WB 1071 kHz, 2 kW Katanning  commenced 1936
6NA  918 kHz, 2 kW Narrogin   commenced 1951
6AM  864 kHz, 2 kW Northam    commenced 1934
6MD 1098 kHz, 2 kW Merredin   commenced 1941
6KG  981 kHz, 2 kW Kalgoorlie commenced 1931
6SE  747 kHz, 5 kW Esperance  commenced 1982

References

Southern Cross Media Group
Defunct Australian radio networks
Radio stations in Western Australia